Diósgyőri VTK is a Hungarian women's basketball club playing in the Hungarian Championship. It was founded after World War II. In 1991, it separated from the Diósgyőri VTK football club and began to play as Diósgyőri KSK. It won the National Cup in 1993 and 1994 and it was a regular in the Ronchetti Cup through the 1990s. It has subsequently made four appearances in the Eurocup. In 2006, the club dissolved but was re-founded in 2011. In 2013, the club re-joined the DVTK.

Titles
 Hungarian Cup
 Winner (4): 1992/1993, 1993/1994, 2015/2016, 2021/2022
 Runner-up (4): 1996/1997, 2004/2005, 2014/2015, 2020/2021
  Hungarian Championship
 Runner-up (5): 1991/1992, 1993/1994, 1995/1996, 2014/2015, 2018/2019
 Bronze medal (4): 1958/1959, 1992/1993, 1994/1995, 2004/2005

Current roster

20212022 roster

Head coach: 
 Attila Földi until 22. November 2021. 
 Péter Völgyi from 22. November 2021.

The 20212022 roster is shown below.

 #5 (1.91)  Sheridene Green
 #7 (1.79)  Veronika Kányási
 #8 (1.80)  Snežana Bogičević
 #10 (1.75)  Nina Aho
 #11 (1.75)  Dóra Medgyessy
 #20 (1.85)  Keyona Hayes
 #23 (1.71)  Zsófia Bacsó
 #24 (1.87)  Franka Tóth
 #27 (1.93)  Anna Vég-Dudás
 #30 (1.92)  Angelika Kiss
 #35 (1.87)  Milica Jovanović
 #43 (???)  Márkusz Lilla
 #47 (???)  Oláh Fruzsina
 #92 (1.77)  Bernáth Réka

20202021 roster

Head coach:  Attila Földi

The 20202021 roster is shown below.

 #1 (1.85)  Szonja Vukov
 #3 (1.80)  Petra Pusztai
 #7 (1.79)  Veronika Kányási
 #10 (1.75)  Nina Aho
 #11 (1.75)  Dóra Medgyessy
 #20 (1.89)  Keyona Hayes
 #23 (1.71)  Zsófia Bacsó
 #24 (1.87)  Franka Tóth
 #27 (1.93)  Anna Vég-Dudás
 #30 (1.92)  Angelika Kiss
 #45 (1.95)  Chanel Mokango
 #99 (1.73)  Nikolett Frindt

Left the team during the season
 #28 (1.93)  Kristine Vitola

20192020 roster

Head coach:  László Cziczás

The 20192020 roster is shown below.

 #3 (1.80)  Petra Pusztai
 #5 (1.164)  Karina Kecskés
 #7 (1.79)  Veronika Kányási
 #8 (1.71)  Réka Szűcs
 #11 (1.75)  Dóra Medgyessy
 #12 (1.80)  Szidónia Katona
 #15 (1.85)  Dorina Zele
 #17 (1.94)  Ziomara Morrison
 #21 (1.72)  Nóra Szegeczki
 #18 (1.88)   Cyesha Goree
 #23 (1.71)  Zsófia Bacsó
 #24 (1.87)  Maja Škorić
 #27 (1.93)  Anna Vég-Dudás
 #30 (1.92)  Angelika Kiss
 #32 (1.80)  Shatori Walker-Kimbrough
 #33 (1.74)  Bianka Kababik
 #45 (1.95)  Chanel Mokango
 #99 (1.73)  Nikolett Frindt

20182019 roster

Head coach:  László Cziczás

The 20182019 roster is shown below.

 #5 (1.78)  Fanni Szabó
 #7 (1.79)  Veronika Kányási
 #8 (1.71)  Réka Szűcs
 #10 (1.74)  Nóra Eperjesi
 #11 (1.75)  Dóra Medgyessy
 #12 (1.80)  Szidónia Katona
 #14 (1.91)  Eglė Šulčiūtė
 #15 (1.85)  Dorina Zele
 #22 (1.91)  Aija Putniņa
 #24 (1.87)  Maja Škorić
 #30 (1.88)  Angelika Kiss
 #32 (1.80)  Shatori Walker-Kimbrough
 #33 (1.74)  Bianka Kababik
 #45 (1.95)  Chanel Mokango
 #99 (1.73)  Nikolett Frindt

20172018 roster

Head coach:  Štefan Svitek;  Erzsébet Ambrus

The 20172018 roster is shown below.

 #1 (1.77)  Gréta Schmidt
 #3 (1.78)  Boglárka Bach
 #5 (1.78)  Fanni Szabó
 #6 (1.80)  Krisztina Raksányi
 #8 (1.70)  Dóra Nagy
 #14 (1.90)  Tereza Peckova
 #15 (1.85)  Dorina Zele
 #21 (1.91)  Aldazabal Laura
 #22 (1.94)  Zenta Melnika
 #25 (1.85)  Szonja Vukov
 #30 (1.88)  Angelika Kiss
 #32 (1.91)  Alyssia Brewer
 #33 (1.77)  Asleigh Fontenette

Left the team during the season

 #11 (1.82)  Kirby Burkholder 08/03/2017

20162017 roster

Head coach:  Maikel López

The 20162017 roster is shown below.

 #2 (1.93)   Louella Tomlinson
 #4 (1.78)  Tierra Ruffin-Pratt
 #6 (1.89)  Dorottya Győri
 #7 (1.79)  Jázmin Vörösházi
 #8 (1.70)  Bernadett Horváth
 #10 (1.82)  Lilla Adamecz
 #11 (1.77)  Tímea Czank
 #12 (1.78)  Boglárka Bach
 #14 (1.92)  Tina Jovanović
 #15 (1.82)  Ágnes Gorjanácz
 #17 (1.81)  Zsófia Arad
 #18 (1.78)  Dorina Kalocsai
 #21 (1.91)  Rita Rasheed
 #23 (1.89)  Orsolya Szécsi
 #41 (1.82)  Emőke Sikora

Left the team during the season

 #1 (1.70)  Samantha Prahalis
 #13 (1.93)  Cierra Robertson-Warren
 #42 (1.91)  Kaylon Williams

20152016 roster

Head coach:  Maikel López

The 20152016 roster is shown below.

 #5 (1.95)  Dóra Horti
 #6 (1.80)  Tatsiana Likhtarovich
 #8 (1.70)  Bernadett Horváth
 #10 (1.84)  Petra Szabó
 #11 (1.77)  Tímea Czank
 #12 (1.78)  Boglárka Bach
 #13 (1.82)  Réka Bálint
 #14 (1.92)  Tina Jovanović
 #15 (1.80)  Roneeka Hodges
 #18 (1.78)  Dorina Kalocsai
 #21 (1.82)  Rasheed Rita
 #23 (1.89)  Orsolya Szécsi
 #32 (1.90)  Alyssia Brewer
 #41 (1.82)  Emőke Sikora
 #44 (1.92)  Daniella Bartucz
 #51 (1.81)  Zsófia Arad

Left the team during the season

 #3 (1.77)  D'shara Strange
 #4 (1.75)  Tayler Hill

20142015 roster

Head coach:  Maikel López

The 20142015 roster is shown below.

 #1 (1.87)  Rachel Allison
 #4 (1.85)  Debóra Dubei
 #5 (1.80)  Romina Ciappina
 #8 (1.70)  Bernadett Horváth
 #10 (1.84)  Petra Szabó
 #11 (1.77)  Tímea Czank
 #12 (1.81)  Zsófia Arad
 #13 (1.82)  Réka Bálint
 #14 (1.82)  Emőke Sikora
 #15 (1.91)   Naignouma Coulibaly
 #21 (1.82)  Rasheed Rita
 #23 (1.89)  Orsolya Szécsi
 #55 (1.89)  Abby Bishop

Left the team during the season
  Italee Lucas after pre-season 
  Katsiaryna Snytsina 1/1/2015
  Tiffany Bias 1/1/2015

20132014 roster 

Head coach:  Ákos Peresztegi Nagy;  Maikel López

The 20132014 roster is shown below.

 #4 (1.84)  Helena Sverrisdóttir
 #5 (1.82)  Brittainy Raven
 #6 (1.83)  Brigitta Szabó
 #8 (1.70)  Bernadett Horváth
 #9 (1.72)  Mónika Bukovszki
 #10 (1.84)  Petra Szabó
 #11 (1.76)  Tímea Czank
 #12 (1.89)  Viktória Vincze
 #13 (1.82)  Réka Bálint
 #32 (1.95)  Rebecca Tobin
 #44 (1.81)  Debóra Dubei
 #45 (1.90)  Liene Jansone

20122013 roster
Head coach:  Ákos Peresztegi Nagy

  (1.92)  Fruzsina Fejes
  (1.90)  Bettina Bozoki
  (1.90)  Lenita Sanford
  (1.84)  Maja Škorić
  (1.83)  Brittainey Raven
  (1.83)  Dora Reiner
  (1.83)  Petra Szabo
  (1.82)  Brigitta Szabo
  (1.80)  Debora Dubei
  (1.80)  Emoke Sikora
  (1.75)  Brankica Hadžović
  (1.74)  Kata Furtos
  (1.71)  Monika Bukovszki
  (?.??)  Zsofia Arad
  (?.??)  Tamara Hajer
  (?.??)  Barbara Ocsenas

References

Miskolc DKSK
Sport in Miskolc
Basketball teams established in 1946
1946 establishments in Hungary